Paolo Monelli (born 27 January 1963) is a retired Italian professional footballer who played as a forward.

References

1963 births
Living people
Italian footballers
Italy under-21 international footballers
Serie A players
Serie B players
Serie C players
A.C. Monza players
ACF Fiorentina players
Ascoli Calcio 1898 F.C. players
S.S. Lazio players
S.S.C. Bari players
Delfino Pescara 1936 players
L.R. Vicenza players
Association football forwards